Serixia fulvida is a species of beetle in the family Cerambycidae. It was described by Francis Polkinghorne Pascoe in 1867. It is known from Borneo, the Philippines, and Moluccas.

References

Serixia
Beetles described in 1867